The following is a list of monastic houses in Lincolnshire, England.

One unusual feature is the large number in the Witham Valley

Listing

See also
 List of monastic houses in England

Notes

References

Bibliography

External links
 Lincolnshire Heritage.org: Monasteries in Lincolnshire guide

History of Lincolnshire
England in the High Middle Ages
Medieval sites in England
Lists of buildings and structures in Lincolnshire
Archaeological sites in Lincolnshire
.
Houses in Lincolnshire
Lincolnshire
Lincolnshire